Adhu Antha Kaalam is a 1988 Indian Tamil-language film directed by Valampuri John in his directorial debut. The film stars Charan Raj and Lakshmi.

Plot

Cast 
Charan Raj
Lakshmi
Sarath Babu

Soundtrack 
Soundtrack was composed by Chandrabose.

Reception 
The Indian Express wrote, "Valampuri John's film plays badly till halftime .... sloppy cuts make the jumpy script unbearable".

References

External links 
 

1980s Tamil-language films
1988 directorial debut films
1988 films
Films scored by Chandrabose (composer)